Lamont (sometimes ), also spelt LaMont, is a surname with several origins, one Scottish, with a branch in Ulster, the other French.

In some cases the surname originates in Scotland as Clan Lamont. The name is derived from the medieval personal name Lagman which is from the Old Norse Logmaðr. The Old Norse name Logmaðr is composed to two elements: log which is plural of lag meaning "law" (from leggja meaning "to lay down") + maðr meaning "man."

In other cases the surname originates in France. In this case Lamont or LaMont is a habitational name derived from several places called Amont (meaning upstream or uphill) in Haute-Saône and Haute-Vienne.

People with the last name Lamont or LaMont

Alasdair Lamont, Scottish sports presenter
Ann Lamont, American venture capitalist
Billy Lamont (born 1936), Scottish football player and manager
Bishop Lamont (born 1978), American rapper
Byron Lamont (born 1945), Australian botanist
Charles Lamont (1895–1993), American filmmaker
Chris LaMont, filmmaker and co-founder of the Phoenix Film Festival
Christine Lamont (born 1959), involved in the 1989 kidnapping of Brazilian businessman, Abilio Diniz
Corliss Lamont (1902–1995), American socialist philosopher
Daniel S. Lamont (1851–1905), United States Secretary of War during Grover Cleveland's second term
Dean LaMont, television director and camera operator
Donal Lamont (1911–2003), Irish-Rhodesian Catholic bishop and missionary
Duncan Lamont (1918–1978), British actor
Duncan Lamont, British jazz saxophone player and composer
Elish Lamont (1800–1870), Irish miniaturist
Gene Lamont (born 1946), American baseball player and manager
George Lamont, footballer from New Zealand
George D. Lamont (1819–1876), New York lawyer and politician
James Lamont (explorer) (1828–1913), Scottish explorer and Member of Parliament
James Lamont (footballer) (1875-unknown), British footballer
James Lamont (writer) (born 1982), British screenwriter and producer
Joe Lamont, rock singer-songwriter and musician
Johann Lamont (born 1957), Scottish politician
Johann von Lamont (1805–1879), Scottish-German astronomer and magician
John Lamont (disambiguation), several people
Lansing Lamont (1930–2013), American journalist and book author
Michèle Lamont (born 1957), Canadian sociologist
Molly Lamont (1910–2001), British film actress
Ned Lamont (born 1954), American businessman and politician, 89th Governor of Connecticut
Norman Lamont (born 1942), British politician
Peter Lamont (1929–2020), British film set decorator
Peter Lamont (footballer), Scottish footballer
Peter Lamont (historian), Scottish historian and magician
Robert P. Lamont (1867–1948), United States Secretary of Commerce during the administration of Herbert Hoover
Rory Lamont, Scottish rugby player
Sean Lamont, Scottish rugby player
Thomas W. Lamont (1870–1948), American banker
William C. Lamont (born 1827), New York lawyer and politician

People with the given name Lamont, LaMont or La Mont
Lamont Bentley (1973–2005), American actor and rapper
Lamont Brightful (born 1979), American football player
Lamont Bryan (born 1988), German-born Jamaica international rugby player
Lamont Coleman (1974–1999), American rapper known professionally as Big L
Lamont Dozier (born 1941-2022), American singer-songwriter and record producer
Lamont Gaillard (born 1996), American football player
Lamont Hawkins a.k.a. U-God, American rapper and member of New York hip-hop group the Wu-Tang Clan
Lamont Hollinquest (born 1970), American football player
Lamont Marcell Jacobs (born 1994), Italian track and field sprinter
Lamont Johnson (1922–2010), American actor and film director
Lamont Johnson (fretless bassist) (born 1955), American musician
LaMont Johnson (1941–1999), American jazz pianist
Lamont Jones (born 1990), American basketball player
Lamont Jones (basketball, born 1972), American basketball player
LaMont Jordan (born 1978), American football player and coach
Lamont Pearson (born 1971), American boxer
Lamont Peterson (born 1984), American boxer
Lamont Reid (born 1982), American football player
LaMont Smith (born 1972), American Olympic athlete
Lamont Strothers (born 1968), American basketball player
Lamont Thompson (born 1978), American football player
Lamont Warren (born 1973), American football player
La Mont West (born 1930), American anthropologist 
Lamont Young (1851–1880), Australian assistant geological surveyor for the New South Wales Mines Department
Lamont Young (architect) (1851–1929), Italian architect and urban planner
David Christopher Lamont Berry (born 1991), American basketball player in the Israeli Basketball Premier League
Duncan Lamont Clinch (1787–1849), American army officer
Harold Lamont Otey (1951–1994), American convicted murderer
Marianne Lamont Horinko (born 1961), worked in the United States Environmental Protection Agency (EPA) during the first term of George W. Bush

Fictional characters
Lamont Cranston, mysterious hero of the 1930s radio drama The Shadow
Lamont Sanford, portrayed by Demond Wilson on the 1972–77 sitcom Sanford and Son

See also
Lamont (disambiguation)
Lamonte (disambiguation), includes La Monte

References